The 57th Massachusetts General Court, consisting of the Massachusetts Senate and the Massachusetts House of Representatives, met in 1836 during the governorship of Edward Everett. Horace Mann served as president of the Senate and Julius Rockwell served as speaker of the House.

Senators

Representatives

See also
 24th United States Congress
 List of Massachusetts General Courts

References

Further reading

External links
 
 

Political history of Massachusetts
Massachusetts legislative sessions
massachusetts
1836 in Massachusetts